Saint-Claude is a municipality in Quebec.

Demographics

Population

Language
Mother tongue (2011)

See also
List of municipalities in Quebec

References

Municipalities in Quebec
Incorporated places in Estrie